George Pravda (19 June 19161 May 1985) was a Czechoslovak theatre, film and television actor.

Early life
He began his career in Czechoslovakia, where he was credited as Jiří Pravda, and then emigrated to the United Kingdom in 1956.

Career
He appeared in numerous British films and television series.

His film credits include: Battle of the V-1 (1958), Thunderball (1965), Inspector Clouseau (1968), Frankenstein Must Be Destroyed (1969), The Kremlin Letter (1970), Taste of Excitement (1970), Dracula (1974), The London Connection (1979), Hanover Street (1979) and Firefox (1982).

TV appearances include: No Hiding Place; The Avengers; The Saint; The Baron; The Prisoner; Special Branch; Department S; Callan; Softly, Softly; Doctor Who (in the serials The Enemy of the World, The Mutants and The Deadly Assassin); Doomwatch; Codename; Public Eye; Spy Trap; Moonbase 3; Colditz; QB VII; I, Claudius; The Duchess of Duke Street; 1990; The Professionals; The Onedin Line; Tinker Tailor Soldier Spy; Chessgame and Bulman.

Personal life
His wife Hana Maria was an actress.

Filmography

 Ill Met by Moonlight (1957) - German Officer Talking to Niko (uncredited)
 Scotland Yard (film series) The Mail Van Murder (1957) - Captain Marison.
 No Time to Die (1958) - German sergeant
 Battle of the V-1  (1958) - Karewski
 Operation Amsterdam (1958) - Portmaster
 Sink the Bismarck! (1960) - Damage Control Officer on the Bismarck (uncredited)
 Follow That Horse! (1960) - Hammler
 Reach for Glory (1962) - Mr. Stein
 Playback (1962) - Simon Shillack
 The Password Is Courage (1962) - 2nd German Officer at French Farm 
 Hot Enough for June (1964) - Pravelko (uncredited)
 Hide and Seek (1964) - Frank Melnicker
 Ring of Spies (1964) - Secondary Supporting Role
 Thunderball (1965) - Ladislav Kutze
 Where the Spies Are (1966) - 1st Agent
 Submarine X-1 (1968) - Captain Erlich
 Inspector Clouseau (1968) - Wulf
 Decline and Fall... of a Birdwatcher (1968) - Harbour Policeman
 The Shoes of the Fisherman (1969) - Gorshenin (credit only)
 Frankenstein Must Be Destroyed (1969) - Dr. Frederick Brandt
 Taste of Excitement (1969) - Dr. Forla
 The Kremlin Letter (1970) - Kazar
 Underground (1970) - Menke
 S*P*Y*S (1974) - Russian Coach (uncredited)
 The Next Man (1976) - Russian Economist 
 The London Connection (1979) - Kolenkov
 Hanover Street (1979) - French Farmer
 Hopscotch (1980) - Saint Breheret
 Firefox (1982) - General Borov

References

External links
 

1916 births
1985 deaths
Czech stage actors
Czech male stage actors
Czech male film actors
Czech male television actors
Czechoslovak emigrants to the United Kingdom
Male actors from Prague
Czechoslovak male actors